Juan Morillo is the name of:

 Juan Morillo (athlete) (born 1972), Venezuelan sprinter
 Juan Morillo (baseball) (born 1983), Dominican baseball pitcher

See also
Juan Murillo (born 1982), Venezuelan professional road racing cyclist